Marc-Oliver Kempf (born 28 January 1995) is a German professional footballer who plays as a centre-back for Bundesliga club Hertha BSC.

Club career
Kempf started his career at Eintracht Frankfurt, appearing for both the reserves and the senior team.
On 15 July 2014, Kempf joined SC Freiburg on an immediate transfer from Frankfurt. The transfer fee reportedly amounted to €800,000.

On 14 May 2018, Kempf signed a four-year-contract with VfB Stuttgart, enabling him to join the team on a free transfer on 1 July 2018.

On 25 January 2022, Kempf signed a contract with Hertha BSC until 2026.

International career
Kempf has played for each German youth national team from U16 to U21.

Career statistics

Honours
Germany U19
 UEFA European Under-19 Championship: 2014

Germany U21
 UEFA European Under-21 Championship: 2017

References

External links

 Profile at the Hertha BSC website
 
 
 Marc-Oliver Kempf at scfreiburg.com

1995 births
Living people
People from Lich, Germany
Sportspeople from Giessen (region)
German footballers
Footballers from Hesse
Association football central defenders
Germany youth international footballers
Germany under-21 international footballers
Bundesliga players
2. Bundesliga players
Regionalliga players
Eintracht Frankfurt players
Eintracht Frankfurt II players
SC Freiburg players
SC Freiburg II players
VfB Stuttgart players
Hertha BSC players